Oxymormyrus is a small genus of elephantfish in the family Mormyridae.

Taxonomy and species 

The validity of this genus is disputed. Catalog of Fishes only includes one species, while a second (marked with a star* in the list) occasionally has been included. Both these are placed in Mormyrops by FishBase.

 Oxymormyrus boulengeri (Pellegrin, 1900) (Alima River mormyrid)
 Oxymormyrus zanclirostris* (Günther, 1867) (Pool elephantfish)

References 

Weakly electric fish
Mormyridae
Ray-finned fish genera